Ariadne Welter (June 29, 1930 – December 13, 1998) was a Mexican movie actress of the Golden Age of Mexican cinema. She appeared in the Luis Buñuel  film The Criminal Life of Archibaldo de la Cruz (1955). In 1956 she starred in the film El Vampiro, a classic among Mexican horror films.

Early life and career
Welter was born in Mexico City, the daughter of Dutch engineer and Royal Dutch Shell executive Gerardus Jacob Welter and his Mexican-born wife of Spanish, German and French descent Blanca Rosa Vorhauer. Her family moved a great deal during Ariadne's youth, living everywhere from South America and Europe, to the Middle East and Africa. As a result of this nomadic lifestyle, Welter became an accomplished polyglot with the ability to speak fluent French, German, Dutch, Spanish, English, Italian, and even a bit of haphazard Arabic and Russian.

Welter had three siblings, a sister, Blanca Rosa Welter (later known as Linda Christian, 1923–2011), and two brothers, Gerardus Jacob Welter (b. 1924) and Edward Albert Welter (b. 1932). She was wife of the notable Mexican film productor Gustavo Alatriste. Via Linda Christian, her sister, Welter was sister-in-law of actor Tyrone Power and aunt of actors Taryn Power and Romina Power.

In 1955, Ariadne starred in the classic Luis Buñuel film The Criminal Life of Archibaldo de la Cruz. In 1956, she starred along with German Robles in the classic Mexican horror film El Vampiro. During the 1960s, Ariadne was one of the principal Mexican stars of the horror and fiction films. She continued to appear in movies and on telenovelas in Mexico in her later years.

Filmography (selected)

Films 
 Prince of Foxes (1949)
 La Rebelión de los colgados (1954)
 The Criminal Life of Archibaldo de la Cruz (1955)
 The Vampire (1956)
 Pies de Gato (1957)
 Locos Peligrosos (1957)
 The Vampire's Coffin (1958)
The Boxer (1958)
 Vacaciones en Acapulco (1961)
 Tres Tristes Tigres (1961)
 Contra Viento y Marea (1962)
 The Devil's Hand (1962)
 El Barón del Terror (1962)
 La Duquesa diabólica (1964)
 Cien gritos de terror (1965)
 Rage (1966)
 Las Mujeres Pantera (1967)
 Esta y l'otra con un solo boleto (1983)

Television 
 Divorciadas (1961)
 Las Momias de Guanajuato (1962)
 Las Modelos (Maniquíes) (1963)
 Cristina Guzmán (1966)
 El extraño retorno de Diana Salazar (1988)
 Maria la del Barrio (1995) as Esperanza Calderón
 Gente bien (1997)
 Mi querída Isabel (1997)
Paloma 1975

Bibliography

References

External links

1930 births
1998 deaths
Mexican telenovela actresses
Mexican television actresses
Golden Age of Mexican cinema
Mexican film actresses
Actresses from Mexico City
20th-century Mexican actresses
Mexican people of Dutch descent
Mexican people of Spanish descent
Mexican people of German descent
Mexican people of French descent
People from Mexico City